Mount Dane is a mountain  west-northwest of Eilefsen Peak in the north part of Radford Island, lying in Sulzberger Ice Shelf off the coast of Marie Byrd Land. The mountain was probably first seen on aerial flights by the Byrd Antarctic Expedition (1928–30). It was named by the Advisory Committee on Antarctic Names for F.S. Dane, a dog driver with the Byrd Antarctic Expedition (1933–35).

References 

Mountains of Marie Byrd Land